The ISO/TC 215 is the International Organization for Standardization's (ISO) Technical Committee (TC) on health informatics. TC 215 works on the standardization of Health Information and Communications Technology (ICT), to allow for compatibility and interoperability between independent systems.

Working Groups
ISO TC 215 consists of several Working Groups (WG), each dealing with an aspect of Electronic Health Records (EHR).
 CAG 1: Executive council, harmonization and operations
 WG 1: Data structure
 WG 2: Messaging and communications
 WG 3: Health Concept Representation
 WG 4: Privacy and Security
 WG 5: Health Cards >>Transitioned to a Task Force on Health Cards.
 WG 6: Pharmacy and medicines business
 WG 7: Devices
 WG 8: Business requirements for Electronic Health Records
 WG 9: SDO Harmonization
Task Forces:
--e-Business for Healthcare Transactions—Multidisciplinary for Healthcare Clinicians—Harmonized Joint Work Group for Devices—Traditional Medicine (Currently restricted to Far Eastern Traditional Medicine)
--Health Cards—Patient Safety and Quality

Leadership
The Technical Committee Chairs are:

Standards
July 2009 Current list of completed standards and other deliverables from TC 215:
 ISO/HL7 279312009
Data Exchange Standards—Health Level Seven Version 2.5 -- An application protocol for electronic data exchange in healthcare environments Health Level 7
 ISO/TR 278092007
Health informatics—Measures for ensuring patient safety of health software
 ISO 277992016
Health informatics—Information security management in health using ISO/IEC 27002
 ISO/TS 252382007
Health informatics—Classification of safety risks from health software
 ISO/TS 252372008
Health informatics—Pseudonymization
 ISO 228572004
Health informatics—Guidelines on data protection to facilitate trans-border flows of personal health information
 ISO/TR 227902007
Health informatics—Functional characteristics of prescriber support systems
 ISO/TS 22600-22006
Health informatics—Privilege management and access control—Part 2: Formal models
 ISO/TS 22600-12006
Health informatics—Privilege management and access control—Part 1: Overview and policy management
 ISO/TR 222212006
Health informatics - Good principles and practices for a clinical data warehouse
 ISO/TS 222202009
Health Informatics—Identification of subjects of health care
 ISO/HL7 217312006
Health informatics—HL7 version 3 -- Reference information model—Release 1
 ISO/TR 217302007
Health informatics—Use of mobile wireless communication and computing technology in healthcare facilities—Recommendations for electromagnetic compatibility (management of unintentional electromagnetic interference) with medical devices
 ISO/TS 216672004
Health informatics—Health indicators conceptual framework
 ISO 21549-72007
Health informatics—Patient healthcard data—Part 7: Medication data
 ISO 21549-62008
Health informatics—Patient healthcard data—Part 6: Administrative data
 ISO 21549-52008
Health informatics—Patient healthcard data—Part 5: Identification data
 ISO 21549-42006
Health informatics—Patient healthcard data—Part 4: Extended clinical data
 ISO 21549-32004
Health informatics—Patient healthcard data—Part 3: Limited clinical data
 ISO 21549-22004
Health informatics—Patient healthcard data—Part 2: Common objects
 ISO 21549-12004
Health informatics—Patient healthcard data—Part 1: General structure
 ISO/TS 212982008
Health informatics—Functional and structural roles
 ISO/TS 210912005
Health informatics—Directory services for security, communications and identification of professionals and patients
 ISO/TR 210892004
Health informatics—Trusted end-to-end information flows
 ISO/TR 205142005
Health informatics—Electronic health record—Definition, scope and context
 ISO 203022006
Health informatics—Health cards—Numbering system and registration procedure for issuer identifiers
 ISO 203012006
Health informatics—Health cards—General characteristics
 ISO 188122003
Health informatics—Clinical analyser interfaces to laboratory information systems—Use profiles
 ISO/TS 183082004
Health informatics—Requirements for an electronic health record architecture
 ISO/TR 183072001
Health informatics—Interoperability and compatibility in messaging and communication standards—Key characteristics
 ISO 182322006
Health Informatics—Messages and communication—Format of length limited globally unique string identifiers
 ISO 181042003
Health informatics—Integration of a reference terminology model for nursing
 ISO 174322004
Health informatics—Messages and communication—Web access to DICOM persistent objects
 ISO/TS 17120:2004
Health informatics—Country identifier standards (Withdrawn 2009-09-22)
 ISO/TR 171192005
Health informatics - Health informatics profiling framework
 ISO/TS 171172002
Health informatics—Controlled health terminology—Structure and high-level indicators
 ISO 171152007
Health informatics—Vocabulary for terminological systems
 ISO 17090-32008
Health informatics—Public key infrastructure—Part 3: Policy management of certification and authority
 ISO 17090-22008
Health informatics—Public key infrastructure—Part 2: Certificate profile
 ISO 17090-12008
Health informatics—Public key infrastructure—Part 1: Overview of digital certificate services
 ISO/TS 160582004
Health informatics—Interoperability of telelearning systems
 ISO/TR 16056-22004
Health informatics—Interoperability of telehealth systems and networks—Part 2: Real-time systems
 ISO/TR 16056-12004
Health informatics—Interoperability of telehealth systems and networks—Part 1: Introduction and definitions
 EN 144632007
Health informatics-A syntax to represent the content of medical classification systems - ClaML
 ISO 13606-32009
Health informatics—Electronic health record communication—Part 3: Reference archetypes and term lists
 ISO 13606-22008
Health informatics—Electronic health record communication—Part 2: Archetype interchange specification
 ISO 13606-12008
Health informatics—Electronic health record communication—Part 1: Reference model
 ISO/TR 12773-22009
Business requirements for health summary records—Part 2: Environmental scan
 ISO/TR 12773-12009
Business requirements for health summary records—Part 1: Requirements
 ISO 120522006 (DICOM)
Health informatics—Digital imaging and communication in medicine (DICOM) including workflow and data management
 ISO/TR 114872008
Health informatics—Clinical stakeholder participation in the work of ISO TC 215
 ISO/IEEE 11073
 ISO/TS 11073-920012007
Health informatics—Medical waveform format—Part 92001: Encoding rules
 ISO 11073-910642009
Health informatics—Standard communication protocol—Part 91064: Computer-assisted electrocardiography
 ISO 11073-901012008
Health informatics—Point-of-care medical device communication—Part 90101: Analytical instruments—Point-of-care test
 ISO/IEEE 11073-303002004
Health informatics—Point-of-care medical device communication—Part 30300: Transport profile—Infrared wireless
 ISO/IEEE 11073-302002004
Health informatics—Point-of-care medical device communication—Part 30200: Transport profile—Cable connected
 ISO/IEEE 11073-201012004
Health informatics—Point-of-care medical device communication—Part 20101: Application profiles—Base standard
 ISO/IEEE 11073-102012004
Health informatics—Point-of-care medical device communication—Part 10201: Domain information model
 ISO/IEEE 11073-101012004
Health informatics—Point-of-care medical device communication—Part 10101: Nomenclature

See also
 Medical record
 Electronic medical record
 International Medical Informatics Association
 Canada Health Infoway
 European Institute for Health Records
 National Resource Center for Health Information Technology
 CEN/TC 251 (European Union)
 Data governance

External links
 http://www.iso.org/iso/standards_development/technical_committees/list_of_iso_technical_committees/iso_technical_committee.htm?commid=54960
 ISO/TC 215 is a member of the Joint Initiative on SDO Global Health Informatics Standardization
 https://web.archive.org/web/20090409120336/http://www.himss.org/ASP/topics_ISO.asp

Electronic health records
215